The Parva Naturalia (a conventional Latin title first used by Giles of Rome: "short treatises on nature") are a collection of seven works by Aristotle, which discuss natural phenomena involving the body and the soul. They form parts of Aristotle's biology. The individual works are as follows (with links to online English translations):

Editions 
All the Parva Naturalia
 Aristote: Petits traités d'histoire naturelle (with French translation and brief notes), ed. René Mugnier, Collection Budé, 1953
 Aristotle: Parva Naturalia (with extensive commentary in English), ed. W. D. Ross, Oxford, 1955 (repr. 2000)
 Aristotelis Parva Naturalia Graece et Latine (with Latin translation and notes), ed. Paul Siwek, Rome: Desclée, 1963
 Parva Naturalia with On the Motion of Animals, tr. David Bolotin, Mercer University Press, 2021.

Multiple treatises
David Gallop, Aristotle on Sleep and Dreams: A Text and Translation with Introduction, Notes, and Glossary. Petersborough, Ontario: Broadview Press, 1990,  (On Sleep, On Dreams, and On Divination in Sleep)

External links 
 Greek text: Parva Naturalia (Biehl's 1898 Teubner edition); HTML text from HODOI (with concordance) and Mikros apoplous (with Modern Greek translation and notes)
 1908 English translation by J.I. Beare and G.R.T. Ross (Oxford 1931): archive.org
 1902 English translation by William Alexander Hammond (1861-1938): Google Books, archive.org, audiobook
 
 Annotated French translation by Jules Barthélemy-Saint-Hilaire

Works by Aristotle